Associação Desportiva Sanjoanense is a Portuguese football club based in São João da Madeira. Founded in 1924, it currently plays in the Liga 3, holding home games at Estádio Conde Dias Garcia.

Appearances
Tier 1: 4
Tier 2: 41
Tier 3: 58 (approximate)
Tier 4: 6 (approximate)

Current squad

Former players

  Wesley John - Saint Vincent and the Grenadines international who played in Portugal for 23 years, including for clubs Ribeira Brava and Porto da Cruz, both below the Portuguese fourth tier)

League and Cup history

Rink hockey

References

External links
Official website 
Zerozero team profile

Football clubs in Portugal
Association football clubs established in 1924
1924 establishments in Portugal
Sport in São João da Madeira
Primeira Liga clubs